Steptolaelaps is a genus of mites in the family Laelapidae.

Species
 Steptolaelaps heteromydis Furman, 1955

References

Laelapidae